The Dark Night is a 1989 Spanish drama film directed by Carlos Saura. It is about Saint John of the Cross, a Catholic priest important to the Counter-Reformation, in solitary confinement in the Carmelite monastery in Toledo, Spain.

Saint John of the Cross was a member of the Carmelite order and a follower of Saint Teresa of Jesus’ teachings.  Teresa of Jesus wanted to reform the Order to emphasize poverty, austerity, and seclusion.  Additionally, Teresa wanted to reimplement observation of the Primitive Rule that Pope Eugene IV relaxed in 1432 within the Carmelites.  The Primitive Rule calls for more time for recitation, devotional studies and readings and puts more emphasis on evangelizing the population.  Observers were not allowed to eat meat and had to fast periodically between the Feast of the Cross in September and Easter.  Together with Saint John of the Cross, Saint Teresa founded the Order of the Discalced Carmelites.  “Discalced” is a Latin word that means “without shoes” and comes from the Discalced Carmelites’ tradition of dressing simply and without shoes.

The reforms were very controversial among the Carmelites in the 1570s.  A group of Carmelites captured John on 2 December 1576 in his dwelling in Ávila and brought him to the monastery in Toledo.  There, the priests jailed John.  He spent 9 months in a small room in horrible conditions with limited light, food, and contact with the outside world.  During his time in the monastery, he suffered greatly.  The movie tells the story of the nine months that he spent in solitary confinement in the monastery between December 1576 and July 1577.

John of the Cross was a famous Spanish poet celebrated for his works that include “Spiritual Canticles” and “Dark Night of the Soul.”  The title of the movie comes from his poem.  His mystical works are about the development of the soul and of the relationship between the soul and God.  During his time in the monastery, he memorized 31 verses of his work “Spiritual Canticles.”  Many years later, he finished his piece.  He wrote all of his works between 1577 and his death in 1591; therefore, his time in the monastery influenced all of his works.

In 1726, Pope Benedict XIII named John as a saint.  Saint John of the Cross is one of the 36 doctors of the Church.

Saura both wrote the screenplay and directed the film.  Andrés Vicente Gómez is the producer.  Juan Diego plays the role of Saint John of the Cross.  The film was entered in the 39th Berlin International Film Festival.

Plot 
The only time that we see images of the city of Toledo is at the beginning of the film.  The first scene of the movie depicts John's journey as a prisoner to the monastery in Toledo. We see a view of the city of Toledo in the early hours of the morning from the mountains.  John wears a blindfold so he can’t see where he is going.

John enters the monastery and a priest removes his blindfold in front of all of the priests in the hall.   They force him to stand trial in front of the friars in the hall of the monastery, but he refuses to obey the friars because he will not ask for forgiveness for his Reformist beliefs.    The friars obligate John to take off his clothes in front of them and put on their robes, but Juan refuses to do so.  Therefore, they put him in solitary confinement.  Later, they take him out of his room so that they can whip him while they sing religious hymns.  After his first whipping, he begins to create his religious poems.  He recites his verses while he prays to God for the strength to survive.

He has flashbacks to a scene when the Mother of a convent introduces him to the nuns who live there.  One of the nuns stares at him, behavior that surprises John.  In the following scene, John is praying to God in his room when the same nun appears.  She wears a white dress and is illuminated by the light from the small window.  She begins to take off her clothes in front of John.  John approaches her and touches her as he circles her.  But, after a moment, he appears very uncomfortable and he walks away from her.  When he turns around, she had disappeared.  The only thing that remains is the white dress on the floor.

One of the friars of the monastery reads the history of the nun, Justina, in front of all of the friars in monastery while they eat.  She was tormented by the Devil and almost renounced the church.  In the same scene, the priests explain to John that the Pope wants to end the Discalced Carmelites, but still, John will not renounce his beliefs.

John is sleeping in his bed when a hand appears next to his head.  More hands appear from all sides of the bed.  The hands rip his clothes apart and scratch his body while he screams.  The image of Justina, the nun, appears but this time, she wears a dark blue dress.  The hands disappear when the friar who takes care of John enters the room.  John says to him that there are demons who want to take over his body to tempt him.  He claims that he had fought against the devil before and offers to tell the warden about the first time that the demon tried to occupy him.  John tells him the story of a woman in the convent who people came to listen to because the seemed dictated by the Devil.  The scene changes to John's memories of the same woman, Justina.  She writhes on the mud floor in the room and says that the demon possesses her.  She throws a cross against the wall.  The scene changes again to another one of John's memories when he enters Justine's room and sees someone in Justine's bed engaged in sexual activities with her.  John himself appears from the sheets.

Close to the end of the movie, John interrupts the dinner and the head priest's Bible reading, saying that he is too proud (referring to himself).  But, when the priest asks him to repeat what he had just said, John asks for forgiveness and says that his outburst was a moment of weakness.  He reaffirms his reformist beliefs and says that they (the friars in the monastery) are mistaken about their traditional beliefs.

In June, John hears Justine's voice and it says that he needs to leave the monetary because he has other, more important work to do in the outside world.  Therefore, John uses his scissors and a ball of yarn to measure the distance from the window in his room to the ground.  He rips the fabric of his robe to make a rope.  When the warden gives him privacy to use the facilities, John breaks the lock on his door.  In the night, he escapes from the monastery from the window with his cord; the film ends here.

Cast
 Juan Diego as San Juan de la Cruz
 Fernando Guillén as Vailer
 Manuel de Blas as Prior
 Francisco Casares as Fray José
 Fermí Reixach as Fray Geronimo Tostado
 Julie Delpy as Virgin Mary
 Abel Vitón as Fray Jacinto
 María Elena Flores as Superiora
 Adolfo Thous as Fray María

Historical accuracy 
The film presents true events in John's life to give context.  At the beginning of the film, a priest in the monastery reads historical facts about John's life when he enters the hall for the first time for his trial.   He also introduces the connection between John and Teresa of Jesus in this moment.  Teresa is represented in a negative manner because the priest says that she has created a conspiracy, therefore presenting the tensions between the different Carmelite groups from the beginning.  The priest describes the differences between his group and the Discalced Carmelites accurately as well.  John's escape from the window using the rope made of his robe is also in line with the historical facts that we have.

But the film is not supposed to be a narrative; rather, it is an investigation.  According to El País, the film explores the central question surrounding John's famous life: “¿Cómo, en efecto, en tan atroz adversidad se las arregló Juan de la Cruz para componer tal exquisitez, una tan delicada música de la palabra?” (translation: “How, indeed, in such atrocity and adversity did John of the Cross resolve to write words so exquisite, delicate, and musical?”).  The manner in which the filming techniques present Juan Diego in such intense moments helps us to understand how the poet was able to write something so important to Spanish literature in such terrible conditions.  In the interview, Saura says that the film is not about religion; rather, the film focuses specially on John's interior processes and secular mysticism.  Therefore, the film is about the skills of this important lyrical poet in Spanish literature.

Production 
Carlos Saura wrote and directed the film starring Juan Diego.  The film is an Andrés Vicente Gómez production.  The budget for the film was 250 million pesetas.  It was filmed by Teo Escamilla. The majority of the filming was done in Madrid in the Roma studios, but parts were filmed in the Veruela Abbey, in Tarazona and in Toledo.  The film's music is by J. S. Bach.

Awards 
The film was entered in the 39th Berlin International Film Festival, but it did not win awards.

References

External links

Saura, Carlos, Andrés Vicente Gómez, Juan Diego, Julie Delpy, Fernando Guillén, and Manuel de Blas. La Noche Oscura. Madrid: Distribuido por Suevia Films, 2008.

1989 films
1980s Spanish-language films
1989 crime drama films
Films directed by Carlos Saura
Spanish drama films
1980s Spanish films